Isotes is a genus of skeletonizing leaf beetles in the family Chrysomelidae. There are currently about 180 described species in Isotes. They are found in the Neotropics.

Species
These 59 species are among those that belong to the genus Isotes:

 Isotes agatha (Bechyné & Bechyné, 1969)
 Isotes albidocincta (Baly, 1889)
 Isotes alcyone (Baly, 1889)
 Isotes antonia (Bechyné, 1956)
 Isotes atriventris (Jacoby, 1880)
 Isotes bertonii (Bowditch, 1912)
 Isotes bicincta (Bowdtich, 1912)
 Isotes blattoides (Jacoby, 1892)
 Isotes borrei (Baly, 1889)
 Isotes brasiliensis (Jacoby, 1888)
 Isotes bruchii
 Isotes cargona (Bechyné, 1958)
 Isotes caryocara (Bechyné, 1956)
 Isotes cinctella (Chevrolat, 1884)
 Isotes complicata (Jacoby, 1887)
 Isotes corallina (Jacoby, 1887)
 Isotes cribrata (Gahan, 1891)
 Isotes crucigera (Weise, 1916)
 Isotes delicula (Erichson, 1847)
 Isotes depressa (Jacoby, 1887)
 Isotes digna (Gahan, 1891)
 Isotes dilatata (Jacoby, 1887)
 Isotes distinguenda (Jacoby, 1887)
 Isotes donata (Bechyné, 1956)
 Isotes eruptiva (Bechyné, 1955)
 Isotes figurata (Jacoby, 1887)
 Isotes ignatia (Bechyné, 1956)
 Isotes imbuta (Erichson, 1847)
 Isotes interruptofasciata (Baly 1879)
 Isotes laevicollis (Jacoby, 1887)
 Isotes lineatopunctata (Jacoby, 1887)
 Isotes marginella (Jacoby, 1879)
 Isotes mexicana (Harold, 1875)
 Isotes multipunctata (Jacoby, 1878)
 Isotes nitidula (Jacoby, 1887)
 Isotes obscuromaculata
 Isotes octosignata (Baly, 1879)
 Isotes onira (Bechyné & Bechyné, 1961)
 Isotes opacicollis
 Isotes pollina (Bechyné & Bechyné, 1962)
 Isotes puella (Baly, 1886)
 Isotes quatuordecimpunctata (Jacoby 1892)
 Isotes rubripennis (Erichson, 1847)
 Isotes sanguineipennis (Baly, 1891)
 Isotes saundersi
 Isotes semiflava (Germar, 1824)
 Isotes semiopaca (Jacoby, 1892)
 Isotes septempunctata (Jacoby, 1887)
 Isotes sexpunctata (Jacoby 1878)
 Isotes sibylla (Bechyné & Bechyné, 1969)
 Isotes spilothorax (Harold, 1875)
 Isotes taeniolata (Gahan, 1891)
 Isotes ternata (Bechyné & Bechyné, 1961)
 Isotes tetraspilota (Baly, 1865)
 Isotes uniformis (Jacoby, 1887)
 Isotes valentina (Bechyné, 1956)
 Isotes varipes (Boheman, 1859)
 Isotes vittula (Bowditch, 1911)

References

Galerucinae
Chrysomelidae genera
Taxa named by Julius Weise